Bathyeliasona abyssicola is a deep-sea scale worm which occurs widely across the Pacific and Atlantic Oceans and over a wide depth range, from 4000m to 8000m.

Description
Bathyeliasona abyssicola has 18 segments, with 8 pairs of elytra and no pigmentation. The anterior margin of the prostomium comprises a pair of acute anterior projections. Lateral antennae are absent. The notochaetae are thinner than the neurochaetae, with bidentate neurochaetae absent.

References

Phyllodocida